John Settle Farm is a historic home and farm complex located at Newark Valley in Tioga County, New York. The house was built about 1840 in the Federal style.  It consists of three principal sections: a 2-story front-gabled wing, a -story side gable, and a long 1-story rear addition.  Also on the property are a dairy barn, horse barn, chicken house, pig house, granary, shed, and silo. The dairy barn is currently in disrepair but all other buildings appear well maintained.

It was listed on the National Register of Historic Places in 1998.

References

Houses on the National Register of Historic Places in New York (state)
Federal architecture in New York (state)
Houses completed in 1840
Houses in Tioga County, New York
National Register of Historic Places in Tioga County, New York